Yavorov may refer to
Yavoriv, a city in Ukraine near the Polish border
Peyo Yavorov (1878–1914), Bulgarian  poet
Yavorov Peak in Antarctica named after Peyo Yavorov
24 SOU "P.K. Yavorov", a gymnasium in Sofia, Bulgaria

See also
Jaworów (disambiguation)